Amy K. LeBlanc is an American veterinary oncologist and biologist researching animal modeling for development of new cancer drugs and imaging agents, and identification of imaging biomarkers, development and optimization of PET imaging hardware and imaging protocols. She is a senior scientist in the molecular imaging program and director of the Comparative Oncology Program at the National Cancer Institute. LeBlanc was previously an associate professor at the University of Tennessee College of Medicine and College of Veterinary Medicine.

Education 
LeBlanc graduated from Michigan State University with a B.S. and D.V.M. She completed a rotating internship in small animal medicine and surgery at Texas A&M University and a residency in companion animal oncology at Louisiana State University. She is board-certified by the American College of Veterinary Internal Medicine.

Career and research 
LeBlanc was an associate professor with tenure and director of translational research at the University of Tennessee College of Veterinary Medicine (CVM) and University of Tennessee College of Medicine. LeBlanc's group at the University of Tennessee published the first comprehensive studies describing molecular imaging of dogs and cats using PET-CT, focusing on the forward and back-translation of 18F-labelled radiopharmaceuticals.

LeBlanc is a board-certified veterinary oncologist and senior scientist in the molecular imaging program at the National Cancer Institute (NCI). She is director of the NCI's Comparative Oncology Program. Her research focus is in animal modeling for development of new cancer drugs and imaging agents, and identification of imaging biomarkers, development and optimization of PET imaging hardware and imaging protocols. In her position, she oversees and manages the operations of the Comparative Oncology Trials Consortium (COTC), which designs and executes clinical trials of new cancer therapies in tumor-bearing pet dogs.

References 

Living people
Year of birth missing (living people)
Place of birth missing (living people)
Michigan State University alumni
University of Tennessee faculty
National Institutes of Health people
American medical researchers
Women medical researchers
Cancer researchers
American veterinarians
Women veterinary scientists
American oncologists
Women oncologists
21st-century American biologists
21st-century American women scientists
American women biologists
American women academics